St. Andrews is a rural municipality in Manitoba, Canada.

The communities of Clandeboye, Petersfield, and Lockport (the part west of the Red River) are located in St. Andrews, which is part of Manitoba census division 13. The city of Selkirk, the town of Winnipeg Beach, and the village of Dunnottar are located adjacent to the municipality but are separate urban municipalities.

History
Since the Red River was an important means of transportation in the early settlement and parish, much of St. Andrews' history can be seen along River Road. The parish of St. Andrews was situated between two major fur trading centers of the Hudson's Bay Company, Lower Fort Garry (near present-day Selkirk) and Upper Fort Garry (located in present-day Winnipeg).

The name St. Andrews was derived from the Anglican parish of St. Andrews, which existed for several decades prior to the formation of the municipality in February 1880.

St. Andrews Anglican Church is one of the most well-known historical sites in Manitoba. Built in 1849, it served a centre of Anglican missionary activity in Rupert's Land. It is the oldest surviving stone church in western Canada and was designated a national historic site in 1970. Its distinctive steeple and Gothic Revival architecture make it instantly recognizable and the building is used as symbol for both the community as well as the nearby St. Andrews elementary school.

Built in 1866 by Captain William Kennedy (1814–1890), it is now used as a museum and tea house. Its nearby flower garden is well known among locals and is commonly used for wedding photos. It was officially recognized as a provincial heritage site in 1984.

Twin Oaks and Miss Davis' School Residence was a girls school and boarding house built in the 1850s by the Red River Settlement and the Hudson's Bay Company. It became a National Historic site in 1962.

Communities and localities 
St. Andrews includes the following communities:

 Clandeboye
 Lockport (part)
 Mapleton
 Matlock
 Netley
 Petersfield
 South St. Andrews

Smaller communities include:
Breezy Point
Chalet Beach
Cloverdale
Less Crossing
Little Britain
McDonald
Melnice
Old England
Parkdale
Rossdale
Sans Souci

Demographics 

Attractions 

In addition to the St. Andrews church, the municipality contains many historical and significant buildings and establishments, including:

 Captain Kennedy House
 Little Britain United Church and Cemetery
 Lockport Provincial Park
 Lower Fort Garry National Historic Site
 Oak Hammock Marsh (partly)
 River Road Provincial Park
 St. Andrews Caméré Curtain Bridge Dam
 St. Andrews Rectory
 St. John's Cathedral Boys' School in Breezy Point
 Twin Oaks
 Winnipeg/St. Andrews Airport

These and several others have been officially recognized as national, provincial, or municipal historic sites. Other noteworthy establishments include the St. Andrews school, the municipal office, Larter's golf course, River Road Provincial Park, and Oak Hammock Marsh (a nature preserve which lies partly in St. Andrews).

St. Andrews Airport, which opened in 1962, provides an alternative to Winnipeg James Armstrong Richardson International Airport for smaller aircraft including many flying to remote First Nation communities. The privately-owned and operated Selkirk Airport and Selkirk Water Aerodrome services smaller aircraft with landing facilities on both land and the nearby Red River for floatplanes.

Notable people born in St. Andrews include Darren Helm, a professional ice hockey player for the Detroit Red Wings of the National Hockey League.

Water 
Residents and businesses in the R.M. of St. Andrews get drinking water from private wells on their own land or purchase water from bulk water suppliers. Two underground carbonate aquifer wells located in the municipality supply part of the drinking water for the nearby City of Selkirk.

Governance
St. Andrews is a municipal government, led by a mayor and 6 councillors. Since 2012, the mayor of St. Andrews has come under some scrutiny for being the highest-paid mayor of the Winnipeg Metro Region. The municipal office for St. Andrews is located in Clandeboye.

References

External links

 RM of St. Andrews website
 Map of St. Andrews R.M. at Statcan
 Manitoba Historical Society - Rural Municipality of St. Andrews

St._Andrews
St._Andrews
St._Andrews